DXKR (639 AM) RMN Koronadal is a radio station owned and operated by the Radio Mindanao Network. Its studio and transmitter are located along Gen. Santos Dr., Koronadal.

References

Radio stations in South Cotabato
Radio stations established in 1978